Jacques Specx (1585 – 22 July 1652) was a Dutch merchant, who founded the trade on Japan and Korea in 1609. Jacques Specx received the support of William Adams to obtain extensive trading rights from Tokugawa Ieyasu, the shōgun emeritus, on 24 August 1609, which allowed him to establish a trading factory in Hirado on 20 September 1609. He was the interim governor in Batavia between 1629 and 1632. There his daughter Saartje Specx was involved in a scandal. Back home in Holland Specx became an art-collector.

The Dutch, who, rather than "Nanban" were called "Kōmō" ("Red Hair") by the Japanese, first arrived in Japan in 1600, on board the Liefde.

In 1605, two of the Liefdes crew, Jacob Quaeckernaeck and Melchior van Santvoort, were sent to Pattani by Tokugawa Ieyasu, to invite Dutch trade to Japan. The head of the Pattani Dutch trading post, Victor Sprinckel, refused on the ground that he was too busy dealing with Portuguese opposition in Southeast Asia.

1609 mission to Japan

Jacques Specx, the brother of Cornelius Specx, sailed on a fleet of eleven ships that left Texel in 1607 under the command of Pieter Willemsz Verhoeff. After arriving in Bantam two ships which were dispatched to establish the first official trade relations between the Netherlands and Japan.

The two ships Specx commanded were De Griffioen (the "Griffin", 19 cannons) and Roode Leeuw met Pijlen (the "Red lion with arrows", 400 tons, 26 cannons). The ships arrived in Japan on 2 July 1609.

Among the crews were the chief merchants Abraham van den Broeck and Nicolaas Puyck and the under-merchant Jaques Specx.

The exact composition of the delegation is uncertain; but it has been established that van den Broeck and Puyck traveled to the Shogunal Court, and Melchior van Santvoort acted as the mission's interpreter. Santevoort had arrived a few years earlier aboard the Dutch ship De Liefde. He had established himself as a merchant in Nagasaki.

The shōgun granted the Dutch the access to all ports in Japan, and confirmed this in an act of safe-conduct, stamped with his red seal. (Inv.nr.1a.).

In September 1609 the ship's council decided to hire a house on Hirado island (west of the southern main island Kiushu). Jacques Specx became the first opperhoofd (chief) of the new company's factory.

In 1610, Specx sent a ship to Korea.

Gallery
Specx owned five paintings by Rembrandt.

Notes

References

 

1585 births
1652 deaths
History of the foreign relations of Japan
Governors-General of the Dutch East Indies
People from Dordrecht
Dutch expatriates in Japan
Dutch chiefs of factory in Japan